Crambus coccophthorus is a moth in the family Crambidae. It was described by Stanisław Błeszyński in 1962. It is found in Jamaica.

References

Crambini
Moths described in 1962
Moths of the Caribbean